Delay is an audio signal processing technique that records an input signal to a storage medium and then plays it back after a period of time. When the delayed playback is mixed with the live audio, it creates an echo-like effect, whereby the original audio is heard followed by the delayed audio. The delayed signal may be played back multiple times, or fed back into the recording, to create the sound of a repeating, decaying echo.

Delay effects range from a subtle echo effect to a pronounced blending of previous sounds with new sounds. Delay effects can be created using tape loops, an approach developed in the 1940s and 1950s and used by artists including Elvis Presley and Buddy Holly.

Analog effects units were introduced in the 1970s; digital effects pedals in 1984; and audio plug-in software in the 2000s.

History
The first delay effects were achieved using tape loops improvised on reel-to-reel audio tape recording systems. By shortening or lengthening the loop of tape and adjusting the read-and-write heads, the nature of the delayed echo could be controlled. This technique was most common among early composers of musique concrète such as Pierre Schaeffer, and composers such as Karlheinz Stockhausen, who had sometimes devised elaborate systems involving long tapes and multiple recorders and playback systems, collectively processing the input of a live performer or ensemble.

American producer Sam Phillips created a slapback echo effect with two Ampex 350 tape recorders in 1954. The effect was used by artists including Elvis Presley (such as on his track "Blue Moon of Kentucky") and Buddy Holly, and became one of Phillips' signatures. Guitarist and instrument designer Les Paul was an early pioneer in delay devices. According to Sound on Sound, "The character and depth of sound that was produced from tape echo on these old records is extremely lush, warm and wide."

Tape echoes became commercially available in the 1950s. Tape echo machines contain loops of tape that pass over a record head and then a playback head. An echo machine is the early name for a sound processing device used with electronic instruments to repeat the sound and produce a simulated echo.  The time between echo repeats was adjusted by varying head position or tape speed. The length or intensity of the echo effect was adjusted by changing the amount of echo signal was fed back into the signal recorded to tape.

A landmark device was the EchoSonic made by American Ray Butts. It is a portable guitar amplifier with a built-in tape echo, which became used widely in country music (Chet Atkins) and especially in rock and roll (Scotty Moore).

Dedicated machines for creating tape loops were introduced One example is the Echoplex which uses a tape loop.  The length of delay is adjusted by changing the distance between the tape record and playback heads.  Another is the Ace Tone EC-1 Echo Chamber.

With the Roland RE-201, introduced in 1973, Japanese engineer Ikutaro Kakehashi refined the tape delay to make it more reliable and robust, with reduced tape wear and noise, wow, and flutter, additional controls, and additional tape heads. Different effects could be created by enabling different combinations of playback heads. By adjusting the controls and tape speed, musicians could create pitch-shifting and oscillated effects. The RE-201 was used by acts including Brian Setzer, Bob Marley, Portishead, and Radiohead.

In the 1970s, Jamaican dub reggae producers used delay effects extensively; Lee Scratch Perry created "lo-fi sci-fi" effects by using delay and reverb on a mixing console test tone and dub techno producers such as Basic Channel introduced delay to electronic music. Digital delay effects were developed with the arrival of digital recording.

Analog delay

Before the invention of audio delay technology, music employing an echo had to be recorded in a naturally reverberant space, often an inconvenience for musicians and engineers. The demand for an easy-to-use real-time echo effect led to the production of systems offering an all-in-one effects unit that could be adjusted to produce echoes of any interval or amplitude. The presence of multiple taps (playback heads) made it possible to have delays at varying rhythmic intervals; This allowed musicians an additional means of expression over natural periodic echoes.

Tape-based delay
Delay processors based on analog tape recording use magnetic tape as their recording and playback medium. Electric motors guide a tape loop through a device with a variety of mechanisms allowing modification of the effect's parameters.

Popular models included Ray Butts' EchoSonic (1952), the Watkins Copicat (1958),  Mike Battle's Echoplex (1959), "whose sounds are still being experimented with today", and the Roland Space Echo (1973).

In the Echoplex EP-2, the play head position was fixed, while a combination record and erase head was mounted on a slide, thus the delay time of the echo was adjusted by changing the distance between the record and play heads. In the Roland Space Echo, all of the heads are fixed, but the speed of the tape could be adjusted, changing the delay time.

Thin magnetic tape was not entirely suited for continuous operation, however, so the tape loop had to be replaced from time to time to maintain the audio fidelity of the processed sounds. The Binson Echorec used a rotating magnetic drum or disc (not entirely unlike those used in modern hard-disk drives) as its storage medium. This provided an advantage over tape, as the durable drums were able to last for many years with little deterioration in the audio quality.

Oil can
An alternative echo system was the so-called oil-can delay method, which uses electrostatic rather than electromagnetic recording.

Invented by Ray Lubow, the oil-can method uses a rotating disc of anodized aluminium coated with a suspension of carbon particles. An AC signal to a conductive neoprene wiper transfers the charge to the high impedance disc. As the particles pass by the wiper, they act as thousands of tiny capacitors, holding a small part of the charge. A second wiper reads this representation of the signal, and sends it to a voltage amplifier that mixes it with the original source. To protect the charge held by the particles and to lubricate the entire assembly, the disc runs inside a sealed can with enough of a special insulating oil to assure that an even coating is applied as it spins.

The effect resembles an echo, but the whimsical nature of the storage medium causes variations in the sound that can be heard as a vibrato effect. Some early models featured control circuitry designed to feed the output of the read wiper to the write wiper, causing a reverberant effect as well.

Many different companies marketed these devices under various names. Fender sold the Dimension IV, the Variable Delay, the Echo-Reverb I, II, and III, and included an oil can in their Special Effects box. Gibson sold the GA-4RE from 1965–67. Ray Lubow himself sold many different versions under the Tel-Ray/Morley brand, starting out in the early sixties with the Ad-n-echo, and eventually producing the Echo-ver-brato, the Electrostatic Delay Line, and many others into the eighties.

Solid-state delay

The bucket-brigade devices (BBD) was developed at Philips in 1969. Delay effects utilizing this technology eventually became available. Notable examples include the Memory Man from Electro-Harmonix, released in 1976 and the Boss DM-2 released in 1981. BBD-based devices offered a convenient alternative to tape delays and leslie speakers but were eventually largely supplanted by digital delays.

Digital delay

Digital delay systems function by sampling the input signal using an analog-to-digital converter. The resulting digital audio is passed through a memory buffer and recalled from the buffer a short time later. Through feedback of some of the delayed audio back into the buffer, multiple repeats of the audio are created. The delayed (wet) output may be mixed with the unmodified (dry) signal after, or before, it is sent to a digital-to-analog converter for output.

The availability of inexpensive digital signal processing electronics in the late 1970s and 1980s led to the development of the first digital delay effects. Initially, digital delay effects were available in more expensive rack-mounted units. One of the first was the Eventide DDL 1745 from 1971. Another popular rack-mount digital delay was the AMS DMX 15-80 of 1978. As digital memory became cheaper in the 1980s, units like Lexicon PCM42, Roland SDE-3000, TC Electronic 2290 offered more than three seconds of delay time, enough to create background loops, rhythms, and phrases. The 2290 was upgradeable to 32 seconds and Electro-Harmonix offered a 16-second delay and looping machine. Eventually, as costs came down further and the electronics grew smaller, they became available in the form of foot pedals. The first digital delay offered in a pedal was the Boss DD-2 in 1984. Rack-mounted delay units evolved into digital reverb units and on to digital multi-effects units capable of more sophisticated effects than pure delay, such as reverb and audio time stretching and pitch scaling effects.

Digital delays present an extensive array of options, including control over the time before playback of the delayed signal. Most also allow the user to select the overall level of the processed signal in relation to the unmodified one, or the level at which the delayed signal is fed back into the memory, to be repeated again. Some systems allow more exotic controls, such as the ability to add an audio filter and modulate the playback rate.

Looping

While the early delay units with a long delay capacity could be used to record a riff or chord progression and then play over it, they were challenging to work with. The Paradis Loop Delay, created in 1992, was the first unit with dedicated looping functions such as record, overdub, multiply, insert, and replace, which made it more intuitive and user-friendly. Gibson manufactured a slightly improved version as the Echoplex Digital Pro until 2006.

Computer software

A natural development from digital delay-processing hardware was the appearance of software-based delay systems. In large part, this coincided with the popularity of audio editing software. Software delays, in many cases, offer much greater flexibility than even the most recent digital hardware delays. Software implementations may offer shifting or random delay times, or the insertion of other audio effects during the feedback process. Many software plugins have added functionality to emulate the sounds of the earlier analog units. Abundant main memory on modern personal computers offers practically limitless audio buffer.

Artistic uses
In popular and electronic music, electric guitarists use delay to produce densely overlaid textures of notes with rhythms complementary to the music. U2 guitarist the Edge uses delay while he plays arpeggios on electric guitar, thus creating a sustained, synth pad-like background. Vocalists and instrumentalists use delay to add a dense or ethereal quality to their singing or playing. Extremely long delays of 10 seconds or more are often used to create loops of a whole musical phrase. Robert Fripp used two Revox reel-to-reel tape recorders to achieve very long delay times for solo guitar performance.  He dubbed this technology  "Frippertronics", and used it in a number of recordings.

John Martyn was a pioneer of the echoplex. Perhaps the earliest indication of his use can be heard on the songs "Would You Believe Me" and "The Ocean" on the album Stormbringer! released in February 1970. "Glistening Glyndebourne" on the album Bless The Weather (1971) showcased his developing technique of playing acoustic guitar through the echoplex. He later went on to experiment with a fuzz box, a volume/wah wah pedal, and the echoplex on Inside Out (1973) and One World (1977). Martyn is cited as an inspiration by many musicians, including the Edge.

Function

Delay effects add a time delay to an audio signal. When the wet (processed) audio is blended with the dry (unprocessed) audio, it creates an echo-like effect, whereby the original audio is heard followed by the delayed audio.

Delay effects typically allow users to adjust the amount of feedback. By feeding some of the delayed audio back into the buffer, multiple repeats of the audio play back (feedback). At low feedback settings, each repeat fades in volume. High levels of feedback can cause the level of the output to rapidly increase (self-oscillation), becoming louder and louder; this may be managed with limiters. The delayed signal may be treated separately from the input audio - for example, with an equalizer.

Most delay effects also allow users to set the delay time, or the amount of time between each audio playback. The may be synchronized to a BPM, allowing users to set time values as beat divisions. Delay is used to create other effects, including reverb, chorus, and flanging.

Digital delay effects record a sample of audio and play it back. Software versions record the audio to a buffer. Digital delay may also modify the recorded sound, by reversing it, altering its pitch, or other manipulations. Some digital delays emulate the "gritty, grainy" sound of earlier delay effects.

Haas effect
Short delays (50ms or less) create a sense of "broadening" the sound without creating a perceptible echo, and can be used to add stereo width or simulate double-tracking (layering two performances). The effect is known as the Haas effect, after the German scientist Helmut Haas.

Ping-pong delay
In a ping-pong delay, the delayed signal alternates between two stereo channels.

Multi-tap
In a multi-tap delay, multiple "taps" (outputs) are taken from a delay buffer, each with independent times and levels, and summed with the original signal. Multi-tap delays can be used to create rhythmic patterns or dense, reverb-like effects.

Doubling echo
Doubling echo is produced by adding short delay to a recorded sound. Delays of thirty to fifty milliseconds are the most common; longer delay times become slapback echo. Mixing the original and delayed sounds creates an effect similar to doubletracking, or unison performance.

Slapback echo

Slapback echo uses a longer delay time (60 to 250 milliseconds), with little or no feedback. A slapback delay creates a thickening effect. The effect is characteristic of vocals on 1950s rock-n-roll records. In July 1954, Sam Phillips produced the first of five 78s and 45s that Elvis Presley would release on Sun over the next year and a half, all of which featured a novel production technique that Phillips termed slapback echo. The effect was produced by re-feeding the output signal from the playback head tape recorder to its record head. The physical space between heads, the speed of the tape, and the chosen volume being the main controlling factors. Analog and later digital delay machines also easily produced the effect. It is also sometimes used on instruments, particularly drums and percussion.

Flanging, chorus effect, and reverb

Flanging, chorus and reverb are all delay-based sound effects. With flanging and chorus, the delay time is very short and usually modulated. With reverberation there are multiple delays and feedback so that individual echoes are blurred together, recreating the sound of an acoustic space.

Straight delay

Straight delay is used in sound reinforcement systems; a straight delay is used to compensate for the propagation of sound through the air. Unlike audio delay effects devices, straight delay is not mixed back in with the original signal. The delayed signal alone is sent to loudspeakers so that the speakers distant from the stage, as in a large outdoor rock festival, will reinforce the stage sound at the same time or slightly later than the acoustic sound from the stage. The delayed signal uses approximately 1 millisecond of straight delay per foot of air or 3 milliseconds per meter, depending on the air temperature's effect on the speed of sound. Because of the Haas effect, this technique allows audio engineers to use additional speaker systems placed away from the stage and still give the illusion that all sound originates from the stage. The purpose is to deliver sufficient sound volume to the back of the venue without resorting to excessive sound volumes near the front.

Straight delay is also used in audio to video synchronization to align sound with visual media (e.g., on TV or web broadcasting), if the visual source is delayed. Visual media can become delayed by a number of mechanisms or reasons, in which case the associated audio must be delayed to match the visual content.

Samples

See also
 Analog delay line
 
 Digital delay line
 Send tape echo echo delay

Notes

References

External links
 

Audio effects
Broadcasting
Effects units
Music looping
Sound recording
Sound reinforcement system